"The Garden", by Andrew Marvell, is one of the most famous English poems of the seventeenth century.

This poem was first published in Miscellaneous Poems. It was published for Robert Boulter, in 1681. This was the first edition. Miscellaneous Poems was sent to the press by Mary Marvell, who claimed she was Andrew's widow.

"The Garden" is a romantic poem. The poet's personal emotions and feelings are told throughout the words of nature. The poet explains the value of nature and is explaining it through the poem.

Marvell recast much of his poem in Latin, "Hortus", printed to follow "The Garden" in the 1681 posthumous Miscellaneous Poems:

Notes and references

Notes

References

Sources
 
 
 

1681 poems
British poems
Poetry by Andrew Marvell
Poems published posthumously